There are many legal abbreviations commonly used by canonists in the canon law of the Catholic Church. However, there is no single system of uniform citation, and so individual publishers and even the standard authors sometimes diverge on usage. This page includes citations, even if duplicative, commonly used in canonical scholarship and doctrine. Latin incipits and document titles have been italicized, while Latin words, phrases, official titles, and dicasterial names have not been so italicized.

Symbol
§—paragraph
§§—paragraphs
°—number

0-9
17/CIC—1917 Codex Iuris Canonici
1917 CIC—1917 Codex Iuris Canonici
1983 CIC—1983 Codex Iuris Canonici

A
AAS—Acta Apostolicae Sedis
ADCOV—Acta et Documenta Concilio Oecumenico Vaticano II apparando
AL—Amoris Laetitia
Ap.—apostolic
Ap. const—apostolic constitution
Art.—article or articulus
Arts.—articles or articuli
Artt.—articles or articuli
ASS—Acta Sanctae Sedis

B

C
c.—canon/canonum, or coram (see "cor." below)
cc.—canons/canones
CCEO—Codex Canonum Ecclesiarum Orientalium
CDF—Congregation for the Doctrine of the Faith or Congregatio pro Doctrina Fidei
CDWDS—Congregation for Divine Worship and the Discipline of the Sacraments
ch.—chapter/caput
chh.—chapters/capites
CIC—Codex Iuris Canonici (may refer to 1917 code or 1983 code depending upon context)
CIC/1917—Codex Iuris Canonici of 1917
CIC/1983—Codex Iuris Canonici of 1983
CICLSAL—Congregation for Institutes of Consecrated Life and Societies of Apostolic Life
CLSA—Canon Law Society of America
congr.—congregation (Roman Curia)
cor.—coram, a (usually appellate) cause heard "in the presence of" an auditor of the Roman Rota

D
Decr.—decretum
DPM—ap. const. Divinus perfectionis Magister on the causes of saints
DV—Defensor Vinculi or Dei verbum

E
EP—Episcopal vicar

F

G
GS—Gaudium et spes

H

I
ICEL—International Commission on English in the Liturgy
ID—Indulgentiarum doctrina
IM—Inter mirifica

J
J—The Jurist, published by the CUA School of Canon Law, 1940-
JCB— Juris Canonici Baccalaureus
JCD—Juris Canonici Doctor
JCL—Juris Canonici Licentiatus
JPE—Jus Publicum Ecclesiasticum
JV—Judicial vicar

K

L
LEF—Lex Ecclesiæ Fundamentalis
LG—Lumen gentium

M
MP—motu proprio

N
NCCB—National Conference of Catholic Bishops (previous name of the United States Conference of Catholic Bishops)
NEP—Nota explicativa praevia to ch. 3 of Lumen Gentium

O

P
PB—ap. const. Pastor Bonus
PCLT—Pontifical Council for Legislative Texts
PCILT—Pontifical Council for the Interpretation of Legislative Texts
Pont. Max—Pontifex Maximus
PP.—Papa, Latin for pope.

Q

R
RI—Regulæ Iuris (cf. RJ)
RJ—Regulæ Juris (cf. RI)
RR—Roman Replies and CLSA Advisory Opinions, published by the Canon Law Society of America (1981-1983 Roman Replies alone, combined with CLSA Advisory Opinions 1984-)

S
S. Congr.—Sacred Congregation (the former name of Roman curial congregations before "sacred" was dropped in 1984 by the ap. const. Pastor Bonus)
SCR—Sacred Congregation of Rites
SRE—Sancta Romana Ecclesia
SRR—Sacræ Rotæ Romanæ

T
TRR—Tribunal of the Roman Rota

U
UDG—Universi Dominici gregis
USCCB—United States Conference of Catholic Bishops

V
VDQ—Vultum Dei quaerere
VG—Vicar general

W

X

Y

Z

References

Sources 

Coriden, James et al., eds. The Code of Canon Law: A Text and Commentary (New York/Mahwah, NJ: Paulist Press, 1985)  xviii-xxiii.
Faris & Abbass, eds. A Practical Commentary to the Code of Canons of the Eastern Churches (Montréal: Librairie Wilson & Lafleur, 2019)  xix-xxxiv.

canon

canon
canon
Catholic canonical documents
Academic canon law